Mesr Dasht (also Romanized as Meşr Dasht and Maşar Dasht) is a village in Chukam Rural District, Khomam District, Rasht County, Gilan Province, Iran. At the 2006 census, its population was 614, in 174 families.

References 

Populated places in Rasht County